Nicholas Randolph Ramirez (born August 1, 1989) is an American professional baseball pitcher in the New York Yankees organization. He has previously played in Major League Baseball (MLB) for the Detroit Tigers and San Diego Padres.

Career

Amateur career
Ramirez attended Katella High School in Anaheim, California. He enrolled at California State University, Fullerton and played college baseball for the Cal State Fullerton Titans as a first baseman and pitcher.

Milwaukee Brewers
The Milwaukee Brewers selected Ramirez in the fourth round of the 2011 MLB draft as a first baseman. In 2017, the Brewers converted him into a full-time pitcher. In his first season as a pitcher he spent his time primarily with the Double-A Biloxi Shuckers, going 7–4 in 48 relief appearances with a 1.38 ERA and holding opponents to a .199 batting average. He followed that up with an 8–0 2018 with Biloxi in nineteen relief appearances, and held batters to just .159. However, he found Triple-A tougher as he went 3–3 with the Colorado Springs Sky Sox over twenty appearances, but finished with a 5.73 ERA while opponents hit .297 off him.

Detroit Tigers
A free agent after the 2018 season, Ramirez signed a minor league contract with the Detroit Tigers. The Tigers promoted Ramirez to the major leagues on May 10, 2019. At time of promotion he had pitched in five games, three for Double-A Erie SeaWolves and two for Triple-A Toledo Mud Hens, starting all five. He held a 1–1 record, 2.31 ERA, and 30 strikeouts to only five walks.

On May 11, Ramirez made his major league debut against the Minnesota Twins, pitching four innings in relief of starter Gregory Soto, who was also making his MLB debut. He earned his first major league win with three perfect innings of relief in a May 29 game against the Baltimore Orioles. For the season, Ramirez went 5–4 with a 4.07 ERA and 74 strikeouts. He led all Tiger relievers with  innings out of the bullpen. Ramirez was outrighted off the Tigers roster on October 23, 2019. Ramirez was resigned after becoming a minor league free agent on November 7, 2019.

On September 9, 2020, Ramirez was selected to the active roster. With the 2020 Detroit Tigers, Ramirez appeared in five games, compiling a 0–0 record with 5.91 ERA and 11 strikeouts in  innings pitched. On October 27, 2020, Ramirez was outrighted off of the 40-man roster, and elected free agency.

San Diego Padres
On December 18, 2020, Ramirez announced via Instagram that he had signed with the San Diego Padres. The minor league deal was announced by the Padres on December 21. On April 17, 2021, Ramirez was selected to the active roster to take the place of the injured Dan Altavilla. Ramirez made 13 appearances in 2021, going 1–1 with a 5.75 ERA and 14 strikeouts. Ramirez was designated for assignment by the Padres on September 17. On October 6, Ramirez elected free agency.

Seattle Mariners
On April 9, 2022, Ramirez signed a minor league contract with the Seattle Mariners organization. He elected free agency on November 10, 2022.

New York Yankees
On December 15, 2022, Ramirez signed a minor league contract with the New York Yankees.

References

External links

Living people
1989 births
Baseball players from California
People from Anaheim Hills, California
Baseball first basemen
Major League Baseball pitchers
Detroit Tigers players
San Diego Padres players
Cal State Fullerton Titans baseball players
Helena Brewers players
Wisconsin Timber Rattlers players
Brevard County Manatees players
Huntsville Stars players
Biloxi Shuckers players
Colorado Springs Sky Sox players
Erie SeaWolves players
Toledo Mud Hens players
El Paso Chihuahuas players
Tacoma Rainiers players
Glendale Desert Dogs players